Jaipur railway division is one of the four railway divisions under North Western Railway zone of Indian Railways. This railway division was formed on 5 November 1951. Its headquarters are located at Jaipur in the state of Rajasthan of India.

Ajmer railway division, Bikaner railway division and Jodhpur railway division are the other three railway divisions under NWR Zone headquartered at Jaipur. This division is one of the key enabler of the Delhi Mumbai Industrial Corridor Project by virtue of running parts of the railways 1,500 km long network of Western Dedicated Freight Corridor.

History

Rail transport infrastructure 
The zone has the following types of locomotive engines:
(Legends: W - broad gauge, D - diesel, G - goods, M - mixed, P - passenger) 
 Phulera Junction railway station sheds: YDM-4 meter gauge locomotives

Medical Facilities 
For the employees and their families, the division also has the following healthcare facilities:

 Zonal Hospitals 
 Jaipur Zonal Railway Hospital near Jaipur Junction railway station 
 Divisional Hospitals 
 None
 Sub-Divisional Hospitals 
 Bandikui Sub-Divisional Railway Hospital near Bandikui Junction railway station (Jaipur division),
 Health Units, several (total 29 across the whole division, including 3 other zones)
 First Aid Posts, unknown (no more than a total of two across the whole zone)

Training 
The zone has the following training institutes:
 <missing>

 North Western Railway zone
 Route km: broad gauge , metre gauge , total  
 Track km: broad gauge , metre gauge , total 

 Jaipur railway division
 Route km: broad gauge , metre gauge , total 
 Track km: broad gauge , metre gauge , total

List of railway stations and towns 
The list includes the stations under the Jaipur railway division and their station category. 

Stations closed for Passengers -

References

 
Divisions of Indian Railways
1951 establishments in Rajasthan